Running for the Drum is the fourteenth studio album by Buffy Sainte-Marie, released in 2008. One of Sainte-Marie's more successful albums, it spawned one single with "No No Keshagesh". Sainte-Marie also rewrote two verses of "America The Beautiful".

History
The album's title comes from a lyric in the song "Cho Cho Fire". Running for the Drum features the DVD documentary on Buffy Sainte-Marie, A Multimedia Life, which features exclusive interviews with artists such as Joni Mitchell and Taj Mahal and performances by Sainte-Marie.

Sessions for this album began in 2006 until 2007, mostly recorded in Sainte-Marie's home recording studio in Hawaii and part in France. The album opens with two aboriginal influenced songs, "No No Keshagesh" (the album's only single and made as if to sound at a rally) and "Cho Cho Fire". Apart from a reworking on the track "Little Wheel Spin and Spin", all of the tracks here are newly written and unique to this album. Running for the Drum won the prestigious Juno Award for Aboriginal Album of the Year. It features her friend, Taj Mahal on acoustic piano.

Track listing
All tracks written by Buffy Sainte-Marie except where noted.

"No No Keshagesh" – 4:44
"Cho Cho Fire" – 3:05
"Working For The Government" – 3:33
"Little Wheel Spin and Spin" – 3:05
"Too Much Is Never Enough" – 3:58
"To The Ends of the World" – 3:45
"When I Had You" – 4:12
"I Bet My Heart On You" – 3:26
"Blue Sunday" – 2:55
"Easy Like The Snow Falls Down" – 3:52
"America the Beautiful" – 3:01 (Katharine Lee Bates, Samuel A. Ward, Sainte-Marie)
"Still This Love Goes On" – 3:55

Personnel
Buffy Sainte-Marie – vocals, guitars, keyboards, piano, percussion and drum samples
Taj Mahal – acoustic piano on "I Bet My Heart On You"
Black Lodge Singers – pow wow sample on "Cho Cho Fire"
Whitefish Jrs. – pow wow sample on "Working For The Government"
Chris Birkett – guitars, bass, drums, programming, percussion, keyboards, Tibetan bowl and string arrangements
Monte Horton – electric guitar
Kirk Smart – lap steel guitar
Pat Cockett – slack key guitar
Nico Mirande – bass
Neil Chapman – bass
Cyril Diet – drums
Adrian Fiorelli – drums
Kevan McKenzie – drums
Jim Birkett – drum programming, sound effects
Roger Jacobs – drum loop and programming

Production
Producer: Chris Birkett and Buffy Sainte-Marie
Engineer: Chris Birkett and Steve Payne
Mixing: Buffy Sainte-Marie and Chris Birkett
Mastering: Seth Foster
Design: Buffy Sainte-Marie and Patrick Duffy for Attention
Photography: Trevor Brady, Denise Grant, Brian Geltner, Emerson & Lowe, D. Boy, Norman Seefe, NASA, ESA and A. Nota

References

2008 albums
Buffy Sainte-Marie albums
Juno Award for Indigenous Music Album of the Year albums